Miss České republiky, originally named Miss Československo, is a national beauty pageant in the Czech Republic. It is the most prestigious beauty pageant in all of the Czech Republic.

History

1989–2009
The modern day Miss Československo/Miss Czechoslovakia pageant was founded in 1989. The first modern-day Miss Czechoslovkia was Ivana Christová of the East Slovak Region (from the part of the region that is now present-day Prešov). In 1993, Czechoslovakia split into two nations, the Czech Republic/Czechia and the Slovak Republic/Slovakia, the pageant as a result was held one last time as Miss České a Slovenské Republiky (Miss Czech and Slovak Republic). Later that year the first Miss Slovakia/Miss Slovensko was held and in the following year the pageant was restructured into Miss České republiky for the Czech Republic only with the first edition taking place. In 2010, Miss České republiky and its rival pageant, Česká Miss merged under the direction of former Miss Československo of 1991, and two winners were selected, one for Miss Universe and the other for Miss World.

2018–present
In 2018, the Miss České republiky pageant returned after the organizers of  discontinued the Miss Summer pageant and acquired the trademark and intellectual rights to Miss České republiky.

Titleholders

Gallery of Titleholders

Representatives at International pageants

Miss Europe

Miss World

Miss Universe

Miss International

Miss Supranational

Miss Globe

Miss Aura International

References

External links
 Miss České republiky

Miss
Recurring events established in 1989
1989 establishments in Czechoslovakia
Czech awards